Monsters and Mysteries in America is an American documentary  television series that premiered March 24, 2013 to April 1, 2015 on Destination America. Repeats air on the network's sister-station, the Discovery Channel. It also sometimes airs on Animal Planet, particularly during one of their "Monster weeks". In the United Kingdom, the series airs on the Sky-owned television channel Pick as Monsters and Mysteries.

Overview
Unlike predecessors such as In Search Of... and MonsterQuest, the series includes numerous legends in each episode and features first-person witness encounters. Each episode is split into three segments, all focusing on one particular monster, legend, or phenomenon. Ron Bowman has served as show runner and writer since the series' launch.  In Season 1 episodes focused on a specific region in the United States; in later seasons, stories within episodes were based on a variety of towns all around the country.  Lyle Blackburn of Rue-Morgue.com has served as consultant and expert. AmericanMonsters.com co-founder Rob Morphy has served, among others, as a consultant and illustrator for the program.

Episodes

Series overview

Season 1 (2013)

Season 2 (2013–14)

Season 3 (2015)

Reviews
Allison Keene of The Hollywood Reporter describes the series: "This series... seems born from a genuine place, which deserves some credit. It's refreshing in its lack of snark, and even though there are many unintentionally hilarious moments... it's not the exploitation TV that is rampant in the current documentary scene."

See also
 In Search Of...
 Unsolved Mysteries
 Sightings
 MonsterQuest

References

2010s American reality television series
2013 American television series debuts
English-language television shows
Paranormal reality television series
Cryptozoological television series
Destination America original programming